Mr. Incredible and Pals (also known as The Adventures of Mr. Incredible) is a 2005 American animated short film produced by Pixar which was included as a bonus feature on the DVD release of its 2004 feature film The Incredibles. It features the characters of Mr. Incredible and Frozone from the feature, plus a "cute animal" rabbit sidekick named Mr. Skipperdoo, chasing and capturing the supervillain Lady Lightbug.

The film is animated in the style of limited animation that intentionally parodies the low budget and low-quality television Saturday-morning cartoons that aired regularly during the 1950s and 1960s.

During this time, television animation studios were contracted to turn out high quantities of product on low budgets, which resulted in many television cartoons that have been derided and mocked by television critics, film, and animation historians, and audiences in general. Mr. Incredible and Pals uses a number of the cost-saving techniques and tropes found in these shows, such as:

 Still shots of drawn scenes, rather than actual frame-by-frame animation.
 Actual footage of live actors' mouths moving instead of animated lips on the characters, a technique known as Synchro-Vox. The most well-known example of this form of "animation" was the Clutch Cargo series.
 A Cold War era plot pitting true, freedom-loving American superheroes against a stereotypical "Communist" supervillain.
 The sidekick (which Frozone is portrayed as) being ensnared by the supervillain so that complete emphasis can be placed on the main hero, who nevertheless thanks the sidekick for his involvement in stopping the villain.
 Frozone speaking in forced "beatnik" slang, showing the out-of-touch depiction of minority characters in animated works at the time.
 A "cute animal" sidekick only added for "children's appeal." In this film, a glasses-wearing rabbit named Mr. Skipperdoo does nothing but hop up and down, yet his actions are seen as crucial to solving the "mystery" that comprises the plot of the episode.

Mr. Incredible and Pals is the first of three short films produced by Pixar Animation Studios, which were animated in traditional 2D hand-drawn animation rather than computer animation. The second film, Your Friend the Rat, was produced in 2007, and included as part of the DVD release of Ratatouille. The third, Day & Night, produced in 2010, was theatrically released with Toy Story 3. The latter two films feature a combination of hand-drawn and CGI animation.

Plot
The episode begins with Mr. Incredible, Frozone, and Mr. Skipperdoo looking over the site of the West River Bridge, which has been stolen, leaving cars stuck on both sides of the river. When Mr. Skipperdoo finds a rivet from the missing bridge, Mr. Incredible discovers it is radioactive and denounces the culprit to be the villainess Lady Lightbug (described by Mr. Incredible as "sinister, yet lovely"). Vowing to amend the situation, Frozone builds a temporary bridge of ice to keep the traffic going, and the three skate away to find their nemesis.

Arriving at an abandoned fairground, Mr. Incredible searches for Lady Lightbug by lifting up various objects but cannot find her under any of them. Mr. Skipperdoo hops to point out that the missing bridge is above him. Suddenly, Lady Lightbug flies out and informs them all of her evil plan to steal the free world's bridges, creating massive traffic jams and thus destroying their economies. She then proceeds to shoot a line of radioactive silk out of her abdomen, ensnaring Frozone. Mr. Incredible throws a Ferris wheel at her, to which she dodges. He then hops in a roller coaster, which takes off flying toward Lady Lightbug. Mr. Incredible then knocks her out of the air, defeating her.

The missing bridge is restored and everything returns to normal thanks to Mr. Incredible, Frozone, and Mr. Skipperdoo; Mr. Incredible adds, "and democracy." Meanwhile, on top of the bridge, Lady Lightbug is trapped in a large jar and imprecates the heroes for her imprisonment. The end of the episode features a brief teaser of the next episode which features a gigantic anthropomorphic ear of corn yelling, “I’ll crush you, Mr. Incredible!” before laughing evilly as the two prepare to fight.

Commentary
In addition to the many in jokes and animation references included in this film, Craig T. Nelson and Samuel L. Jackson provided a DVD commentary for the fictional show, acting in character as Mr. Incredible and Frozone as if sitting down and watching this for the first time.

The in-universe background behind Mr. Incredible and Pals stated that many years before the Supers were banned, Mr. Incredible and Frozone licensed their names and images to a television animation company, and this was the pilot episode for an animated television series that never aired due to the Super ban. The two supers are watching this pilot for the first time several years after it was produced.

The commentary of the two characters provides additional entertainment for the DVD's viewers, as they react with shock and disbelief to the poor quality of the film.

While Mr. Incredible appears to display only apathy for the show, Frozone is aghast and disgusted at its campiness and supposed racism (the show's version of himself appears to be white, or "tan" as Mr. Incredible assumed some of the color faded while in storage). He is also annoyed by Mr. Skipperdoo and Lady Lightbug (the former due to it being a thinly veiled marketing ploy toward kids and the latter because it was a 'made up villain'). By the end of the short, Frozone is so annoyed that he walks out of the commentary at the end, demanding the episode never be aired.

Cast
Roger Jackson as The Narrator and Evil Cornhead
Pete Docter as Mr. Incredible
Michael Asberry as Frozone
Celia Schuman as Lady Lightbug
Commentary
Craig T. Nelson as Mr. Incredible
Samuel L. Jackson as Frozone

References in other media
The novel Incredibles 2: A Real Stretch: An Elastigirl Prequel Story mentions the film several times, referring to it as Mr. Incredible and Friends. In the novel, the film is something Mr. Incredible and Frozone are initially excited for. But after getting to watch it, Frozone immediately lambasts it for how it portrays him and the fact that the film makes them fight alongside a bunny. Mr. Incredible then speaks to Rick Dicker, who agrees to shelve the film.

On a level of Lego The Incredibles, during a burning building Frozone creates an ice bridge to make the tenants come across, one of them then told him and Mr. Incredible that she once saw him on TV where he made the exact same bridge, but due to their vigilante disguises she couldn't recognize him and said he looked nothing like Frozone (referencing his "tan" appearance)

In a 2020 Pixar Animation Internship Reel, a couple of animators created clips to recreate Mr. Incredible and Frozone's commentary about the film while they are watching it within the new Parr household. The ones who animated the clips are Grace Villaroman, Jamie Ryan, Li Wen Toh, Mark Rivera, Sean Muriithi, Seora Hong and Trilina Mai.

References

External links 

 

2000s superhero comedy films
2005 animated films
2005 short films
2000s American animated films
2000s animated short films
2000s animated superhero films
Pixar short films
The Incredibles
American comedy short films
American parody films
2000s English-language films
American animated short films
2005 direct-to-video films
American superhero comedy films
American direct-to-video films